Anchovy sprat, Clupeonella engrauliformis, is a species of fish in the family Clupeidae.  It is one of the several species of Clupeonella found in the Caspian Sea It lives pelagically in the central and southern parts of this brackishwater lake.  It is typically 12 cm long, and up to 16.5 cm maximum. May be found down to 78 m depth.

References

Clupeonella
Fish of the Caspian Sea
Fish described in 1904